The Old Swan Hotel in Harrogate, North Yorkshire, England, is part of the Classic Lodges group.

History 
Hospitality has been available on the site since at least 1777, originally it was the 'Swan Inn" in Low Harrogate separate from the settlement of High Harrogate.

In the late nineteenth century it was extensively redeveloped by the "Harrogate Hydropathic Company" as a fashionable spa hotel, and included Turkish baths. Its name was "The Harrogate Hydro" or as the locals called it "The Hydro". It had its own farm on Penny Pot Lane to provide for the kitchens.

It was the first building in Harrogate to have electric light. A vertical steam engine drove a DC generator and also the hotel laundry. The steam engine was re-activated to drive the laundry by Jack Gill of John Redfearn's garage at the hotel in the 1950s until electric motors took over. The fuel was coke from Harrogate Gas Works.

In 1939 the hotel was requisitioned at 48 hours' notice by the Ministry of Aircraft Production and cables were laid to a new telephone exchange in the Library Restaurant. Power cables were laid directly from the hotel to the corporation power station beside Jenny Plain passing in a straight line through every private property on the way. It was attacked by an enemy aircraft in 1943 but only the house at the end of Swan Road by Ripon Road was destroyed.

By the mid-1950s Harrogate had an image problem. The "Bath Chair" image of Victorian spa towns was now unfashionable and the Hydro was renamed "The Old Swan Hotel" "famous since 1700".

It was listed in 1975 as a Grade II listed building.

In the early 1980s, the hotel was a focal point of the Harrogate International Festival Of Sound—an annual festival of premium hi-fi equipment.

A refurbishment of the Old Swan and its 136 rooms was finalised in 2006.

Agatha Christie's disappearance 
In December 1926 the author Agatha Christie suddenly disappeared from her home. She was missing for a total of eleven days, during which the police conducted a major manhunt, and there was speculation that she had committed suicide. The disappearance even drew other crime writers Sir Arthur Conan Doyle and Dorothy L. Sayers into the search, Doyle's interest in the occult prompting him to take one of Christie's gloves to a medium. After about ten days (having checked into the Swan Hydropathic Hotel under the assumed name Mrs. Teresa Neele) she was recognised by one of the banjo players at the hotel.

A 1979 film about the event entitled Agatha was filmed at the hotel.

See also
White Swan Hotel, Alnwick, also member of the Classic Lodges group.

References

External links 

Hotels in Harrogate
Agatha Christie
Grade II listed buildings in North Yorkshire